Perigonia pallida is a moth of the family Sphingidae first described by Walter Rothschild and Karl Jordan in 1903.

Distribution 
It is known from Venezuela, Paraguay, Bolivia, Argentina and Brazil.

Description 
It is similar to Perigonia stulta, but generally paler and the forewings are narrower. Furthermore, the brown border on the hindwing upperside is narrower and the basal patch is deeper yellow in tint.

Biology 
Adults have been recorded in November in Brazil and from November to December in Bolivia.

References

Perigonia
Moths described in 1903